The 1930 Ottawa Senators finished in 4th place in the Interprovincial Rugby Football Union with a 0–6 record and failed to qualify for the playoffs. This would be the last season that the team would be known as the "Senators" before switching back to the more familiar "Rough Riders" moniker.

Regular season

Standings

Schedule

References

Ottawa Rough Riders seasons